Witton Park Colliery was a coal mine in Witton Park, Witton-le-Wear near Bishop Auckland, County Durham, Northern England.

Development
Part of the Durham Coalfield, coal stocks were known throughout the area to be close to the surface, allowing coal to be extracted through shallow mining methods. From 1756, exploratory bore holes were drilled to find commercial coal seams on the Witton Castle estate of the Stobart family. However, early results showed no commercially viable coal seams.

In 1816 William Chaytor of Croft Hall, Yorkshire purchased the Witton Castle estate for £78,000. He immediately increased the number of trial borings, but it was not until the development of the Jane Pit in 1819 that commercial extraction began. This then brought about the redevelopment of the Mary Ann drift mine as a deep colliery, and the later development of the George Pit, Corving Pit and finally the William Pit.

The commercial development of Witton Park brought about the development of other coal mines in the area, with nearly 100 pits developed within  over the following 150 years.

Closure
After the closure of the Witton Park Iron Works, the coal mines lost their local market, and were totally reliant on transport via the North Eastern Railway for distribution of their product. Having been worked for nearly 100 years, the accessible reserves were also in steep decline. After the start of World War I and the loss of a large number of skilled miners, George Pit closed in 1917, followed by Jane Pit in April 1925 which directly caused the loss of 255 jobs.

Many left the village for other coal mining and steel making districts, and then in the 1930s to build either the new British Army base at Catterick, or latterly to work at the Royal Ordnance Factory at Aycliffe.

Witton Park Ironworks
After agreeing suitable lease rights, the partnership of Bolckow and Vaughan began the erection of Witton Park Ironworks in 1845, the first ironworks in the Northeast of England. Due to the development of similar ironworks in Shropshire, many of the early workers were Irish and Welsh.

With limestone and coal supplies from Witton Park, ironstone was initially obtained from established supplies within the West Midlands. No.1 Blast furnace was put into blast on St. Valentines Day 1846. The company started building No.5 blast furnace on the 24 May 1870, coming into operation on 17 April 1871. The similarly sized No.6 was opened on Guy Fawkes Day 1873, and both became "blown" at the beginning of 1875. Both of these furnaces were capable of outputting 1,100 tons per week.

With trade in iron falling and being replaced by steel, the owners decided to move into steel production on the coast in Cleveland, thereby avoiding railway transport charges. After being partly closed in 1878, the ironworks was shut down on 19 May 1884. Today only the shells of No.5 and No.6 blast furnaces survive.

Transport

Initial distribution of coal was undertaken by horse and cart, but due to the volumes of coal extracted and cost of distribution, a new method of transport was required. George Stephenson was contracted to build a suitable railway to bring the coal down from the hills, and constructed the Etherley Incline Railway, with iron rails held on stone blocks. Opened in 1825, a stationary beam engine controlled the descent of wagons that ran from the colliery to the River Gaunless. Horses then pulled the wagons to the foot of the Brusselton Incline, which descendend into . From here, initially the coal was carried by horse, but this was later replaced by the Stockton and Darlington Railway, who ran the coal to Newport on the River Tees. The Etherley Incline closed in 1843, and today it is designated by English Heritage as an ancient monument and as such is protected.

Post World War II, the site of the foot of the incline was taken over by British Railways, who used it to dump spent ballast materials into a landfill site until 1989.

References

External links
Witton Park Colliery @ ''Durham Mining Museum

Coal mines in County Durham
Underground mines in England